"Nothing Compares 2 U" is a song written and composed by Prince for his side project, the Family; the song featured on their 1985 debut album, The Family. The song features lyrics exploring feelings of longing from the point of view of an abandoned lover.

Several years later, Irish singer-songwriter Sinéad O'Connor recorded a version of the song for her second studio album, I Do Not Want What I Haven't Got (1990). It was released as the album's second single in early 1990 and became a worldwide hit. O'Connor co-produced the record with Nellee Hooper, and its music video, directed by John Maybury, received heavy rotation on MTV. In December 1990, Billboard named "Nothing Compares 2 U" as the "#1 World Single" of 1990 at its first Billboard Music Awards.

Prince released his own rendition of "Nothing Compares 2 U", with Rosie Gaines on guest vocals in 1993. This live version of the song was included on his compilation album The Hits/The B-Sides. His original 1984 studio recording of the song was eventually released in 2018 as a single and later on the 2019 posthumous compilation Originals.

Background
In 1985, the funk band the Family released their only album, The Family. It contained songs written by Prince including "Nothing Compares 2 U". The song was essentially filler music on the album. It was not released as a single and received little recognition. Prince had recorded the song earlier, in 1984, which was not released until April 2018 as a digitally released posthumous single.

Sinéad O'Connor recorded the song for her 1990 second album I Do Not Want What I Haven't Got with a completely new arrangement by her and producer Nellee Hooper. O'Connor's version is in the key of F major.

Prince did not perform the song in concert until the years after O'Connor turned it into a hit, when he began performing the song live. He performed duets with Rosie Gaines in concert and subsequently had a live performance released on compilation albums: 1993's The Hits/The B-Sides, and the 2006 Ultimate Prince. He also recorded a solo version for his concert film Rave Un2 the Year 2000, as well as for his 2002 live album One Nite Alone... Live!.

Commercial performance
O'Connor's power ballad version of the song became a worldwide hit, topping charts in O'Connor's native Ireland, Australia, Austria, Canada, Germany, Mexico, Netherlands, New Zealand, Norway, Sweden, Switzerland, the United Kingdom and the United States. Plus top five in France and top 20 in Denmark. It was certified platinum in Austria and in the United Kingdom, and gold in Germany and in Sweden.

In the United States it spent four weeks at the top of the Billboard Hot 100; in addition, it was number one on the Billboard Alternative Songs chart and reached number two on the Billboard Adult Contemporary chart (held off the top position by Rod Stewart's "This Old Heart of Mine" for three weeks). In terms of its chart performance on the Hot 100 it ranked number three for 1990. In April 1990, it was certified platinum by the Recording Industry Association of America. On the second of its four weeks at number one, the record's parent album I Do Not Want What I Haven't Got started a six-week run at number one on the Billboard 200. In 2019, the single ranked 97 in a Hot 100 60th-anniversary Top 600 covering the period from 1958 to 2018.

In Great Britain, the single ranked number two for the year, behind a re-release of the Righteous Brothers' "Unchained Melody".

Critical reception

The song received favorable reviews from most music critics. Jodi Cleesattle from American Eagle felt that "there is pain in Sinéad O'Connor's voice, and there probably always will be." She remarked that "loneliness and longing" are highlighted on the song, adding that O'Connor's voice "fits the song perfectly. Her vocals soar and leap unexpectedly but gracefully, making, the ballad, the loveliest of love songs." Bill Coleman from Billboard declared it as a "brilliant interpretation of the melancholic lament." Ernest Hardy from Cashbox called it a "genuine tear-jerker". Greg Sandow for Entertainment Weekly felt that it is a song "about how to carry on after losing love". Tom Moon from Knight Ridder said she "adapts the breathy approach of a torch singer." A reviewer from Los Angeles Times noted that the singer "match raw emotion with spare sounds" on "the quiet, desperate, lovelorn beauty". Melody Maker wrote, "It should go without saying that her voice is brilliant, but this is a pointless and embarrassing over-sentimental paw. The zillions of strings don't help, they don't add poignancy, they merely serve to drag the momentum backwards. [...] A waste of talent." 

Pan-European magazine Music & Media stated that out of all the recent covers of Prince songs - Chaka Khan's "I Feel for You", Tom Jones' "Kiss" and Simple Minds' "Sign o' the Times" - "this is definitely the most convincing." The reviewer noted further that originally recorded by Minneapolis band the Family for their 1985 debut album, "O'Connor's emotionally charged version has immediate appeal", and is "destined to be her biggest hit to date." David Giles from Music Week found that the song "is not one of Prince's finest moments, and O'Connor does little to disguise this fact bar a few token vocal somersaults. The string synths also have a dirge-like effect, dragging the rest of the arrangement along with them." The Network Fortys reviewer wrote that "when Sinéad sang 'Nothing Compares 2 U', seas calmed, angels wept and Top 40 radio stood still to listen to this powerful expression of unrequited love." James Brown  from NME said, "Pining for a recently departed love, Sinéad hits the lyrics with an immense range of vocal ability and passion. From a gossamer thin whisper to a searing plea she shows just how much catching up Kate Bush has to do." Tom Doyle from Smash Hits felt that "it doesn't sound at all like any of her other stuff."

Retrospective response
In 2019, Bill Lamb from About.com wrote that O'Connor's "emotional, gutsy performance made it a classic. Painful loss meets stunning vocal beauty with a perfectly understated instrumental arrangement." In their 2020 retrospective review, Matthew Hocter from Albumism described it as a song "deeply rooted in emotion and despair which would go on to certify O'Connor and that song as one of music history's most unforgettable moments." AllMusic editor Steve Huey called the song "stunning" and noted its "remarkable intimacy". In 2010, Tom Ewing of Freaky Trigger noted it as a "very moving track", and added that it "captures the stasis, anger and devastation of a bad break-up with awful accuracy." He also complimented the music "whose stately, sympathetic pulse gives O’Connor the canvas she needs to be so devastating." 

In an 2000 review, Steven Wells from NME said "it remains one of the best 'boo-hoo, my bloke's left me' pop songs ever recorded", and a "stark reminder that O'Connor is blessed with an amazing and unique voice". He concluded with that it "remains the outstanding highlight of her career to date. She's more than capable of surpassing it in the future. Less Sade and more Aretha, please." In 2009, Mark Richardson from Pitchfork constated that "you have to look pretty hard to find a better expression in pop music of the void that exists when a relationship ends." In an 2015 retrospective review, Pop Rescue wrote that O'Connor "makes light work" of the track, and she's "having plenty of power to belt out the lyrics at the right points." The reviewer added that it is a "fantastic exhibit of 90s music". In 2004, Sal Cinquemani from Slant Magazine felt that it perhaps is O'Connor's "greatest vocal achievement" and described it as a "classic torch song she quite simply owns."

Music video

Concept
Directed by John Maybury, the accompanying music video for the song consists mostly of a closeup on Sinéad O'Connor's face as she goes through stages of sadness and anger while singing the lyrics; the rest consists of her walking through the Parc de Saint-Cloud in Paris. Toward the end of the video, two tears roll down her face, one on each cheek. O'Connor has said that her tears were real. She did not intend to cry but then thought, "I should let this happen." She explained that the tears were triggered by thoughts of her mother, who died in a car accident in 1985. She said she learned to channel her emotions with the "bel canto" singing style, which she compared to extreme acting methods. In the middle and at the very end of the video, there is a shot from O'Connor's photo session for the I Do Not Want What I Haven't Got album cover.

Reception
The clip won three "Moonmen" at the 1990 MTV Video Music Awards: Video of the Year (O'Connor was the first female artist to be awarded it), Best Female Video and Best Post-Modern Video. It was nominated for Breakthrough Video, Viewer's Choice and International Viewer's Choice during the ceremony. The video was also the subject of many parodies and spoofs, such as Gina Riley's parody "Nothing Is There" on Fast Forward, referring to the fact that O'Connor tended to shave her head bald.

Prince version
Prince released his own rendition of "Nothing Compares 2 U", with Rosie Gaines on guest vocals. This live version of the song was included on his 1993 compilation album The Hits/The B-Sides. This version reached number seven on the US Bubbling Under Hot 100 chart in 1993 and number 66 on the US Hot R&B/Hip-Hop Songs chart in the Billboard issue dated 15 January 1994. Following Prince's death in 2016, the live recording with Rosie Gaines, peaked at number 43 on the US Digital Songs Sales chart and number 31 on the US R&B/Hip-Hop Digital Song Sales chart.

Prince's original 1984 recording of the song was not released until 2018, when it was issued as a single by Warner Bros. Records in conjunction with his estate. In addition, the Prince version was given its own music video, released in conjunction with the studio recording on 19 April 2018; the video consists of edited rehearsal footage shot in the summer of 1984. Prince's 1984 original recording peaked at number 21 on the US Hot R&B Songs chart and number 8 on the US R&B Digital Song Sales chart in 2018. The song was later included as the final track on Prince's 2019 posthumous compilation Originals, which contains a multitude of demo recordings Prince had made for other artists such as the Bangles and Kenny Rogers.

Legacy
 In 2003, Q magazine ranked "Nothing Compares 2 U" at number 242 in their list of the "1001 Best Songs Ever".
 It was included at number 165 by Rolling Stone in its list of the "500 Greatest Songs of All Time".
 In 2007, VH1 ranked O'Connor's rendition number 10 of the "100 Greatest Songs of the 90s".
 In September 2010, Pitchfork included the song at number 37 on their Top 200 Tracks of the 90s.
 The song was listed at number 77 on Billboards "Greatest Songs of All Time".
 Time magazine included "Nothing Compares 2 U" in its 2011 (unranked) list of "All-TIME 100 Songs".
 In 2012, Porcys listed the song at number 60 in their ranking of "100 Singles 1990-1999", noting that "it's probably one of the noblest, most dignified slow songs of the decade".
 In October 2014, Aretha Franklin released her thirty-eighth and final studio album Aretha Franklin Sings the Great Diva Classics in which she covered several songs by other female recording artists, including an upbeat, jazz version of O'Connor's "Nothing Compares 2 U".
 The song was simulcast on radio stations throughout the United States to commemorate Prince 15 days after his death. The simulcast was timed to reflect the song's opening lyric: "It's been 7 hours and 15 days since you took your love away."
 Chris Cornell posted a link to his version the day after Prince's death. In an accompanying message, he wrote: "Prince's music is the soundtrack to the soulful and beautiful universe he created, and we have all been privileged to be part of that amazing world. I performed his song 'Nothing Compares 2 U' for the first time a couple months ago. It has a timeless relevance for me and practically everyone I know. Sadly, now his own lyrics in this song could not be more relevant than at this moment, and I sing them now in reverence as I pay tribute to this unequaled artist who has given all of our lives so much inspiration and made the world so much more interesting. We will miss you Prince!!!" On Father's Day 2018, Cornell's daughter Toni released a version of the song she recorded with her dad before his death in 2017. In 2020, the song was covered on Chris Cornell's No One Sings Like You Anymore, Vol. 1.
 In 2019, Stacker placed the song at number 20 in their list of "Best 90s pop songs".
 In 2020, The Guardian ranked the song at number 12 in its list of the "100 Greatest UK No 1s"
 Country artist Jon Pardi covered the song on his album Rancho Fiesta Sessions in 2020.
 Cleveland.com ranked "Nothing Compares 2 U" the best Billboard Hot 100 number-one song of the 1990s in 2020, calling it "one of the greatest love songs ever written".
 It was included at number 184 by Rolling Stone in its 2021 update list of the "500 Greatest Songs of All Time".

Track listings

 7" single
 "Nothing Compares 2 U" – 5:09
 "Jump in the River" – 4:13

 CD maxi
 "Nothing Compares 2 U" – 5:09
 "Jump in the River" – 4:13
 "Jump in the River" (instrumental) – 4:04

Credits and personnel

Nothing Compares 2 U
Sinéad O'Connor – lead vocals, background vocals, producer, mixing
Prince – music and lyrics
Nellee Hooper – producing
Chris Birkett – engineering, mixing
Fachtna O' Ceallaigh – mixing

Jump in the River
Sinéad O'Connor – music and lyrics, lead vocals, producer, mixing
Marco Pirroni – music and lyrics
Chris Birkett – engineering, mixing
Fachtna O' Ceallaigh – mixing

Charts

Weekly charts

Year-end charts

Decade-end charts

All-time charts

Ireland chart history
"Nothing Compares 2 U" entered the Irish singles chart on 11 January 1990, reaching number one two weeks later. After a six-week run at the top, Sinéad O'Connor was replaced by "Love Shack" by the B-52's. The song left the chart on 29 March, after twelve weeks.

UK chart history
In the UK Top 100 chart dated 20 January 1990, the single entered at number 30, then rocketed to number three, then to number one, where it stayed for four weeks, holding off a twin challenge from dance acts Technotronic and Black Box. The single slipped to number two in the chart dated 3 March, replaced at the top by "Dub Be Good to Me" by Beats International. "Nothing Compares 2 U" completed its twelve-week run within the UK Top 40 in early April. "Nothing Compares 2 U" was Britain's biggest-selling new recording of 1990, ranking number two in the year-end chart behind a re-release of the Righteous Brothers' 1965 hit "Unchained Melody".

US chart history
The single entered the Top 40 of the Billboard Hot 100 at number 33, in the issue dated 24 March 1990. "Nothing Compares 2 U" rose steadily over the next four weeks – no doubt bolstered by the increasing exposure of the song's video on MTV – before reaching number one in the issue dated 21 April. The single took just six weeks to reach number one – tied with Madonna's "Vogue" and New Kids on the Block's "Step by Step" as the year's fastest climber to the top. It spent four weeks at number one, as it did in the UK, with Jane Child's "Don't Wanna Fall in Love" and Calloway's "I Wanna Be Rich" stuck at number two. Madonna's "Vogue" replaced it at number one. The single spent ten weeks in the Top Ten – one of only four 1990 releases to do so – and finished its 15-week run in the US Top 40 in late June.

Certifications and sales

Release history

See also
List of European number-one airplay songs of the 1990s

References

1980s ballads
1985 songs
1990 singles
1990s ballads
Billboard Hot 100 number-one singles
Cashbox number-one singles
Chrysalis Records singles
Dutch Top 40 number-one singles
European Hot 100 Singles number-one singles
Irish Singles Chart number-one singles
MTV Video Music Award for Best Female Video
MTV Video of the Year Award
Number-one singles in Australia
Number-one singles in Austria
Number-one singles in Belgium
Number-one singles in Denmark
Number-one singles in Finland
Number-one singles in Germany
Number-one singles in Iceland
Number-one singles in Italy
Number-one singles in New Zealand
Number-one singles in Norway
Number-one singles in Portugal
Number-one singles in Sweden
Number-one singles in Poland
Number-one singles in Switzerland
Pop ballads
Prince (musician) songs
RPM Top Singles number-one singles
Sinéad O'Connor songs
Song recordings produced by Nellee Hooper
Songs about loneliness
Songs written by Prince (musician)
Torch songs
UK Singles Chart number-one singles